The Leona M. and Harry B. Helmsley Charitable Trust is a foundation established in 1999 and administered by four trustees selected by Leona Helmsley. The Trust supports a wide range of organizations, with a major focus on health and medical research, in addition to conservation, education, social services and cultural access.

In April 2022, The Leona M. and Harry B. Helmsley Charitable Trust, announced a $22.5 million donation to the Neglected tropical diseases fund, The END Fund. The aim of the donation was to aid in the supporting 1.7 billion people affected by EDN’s such as onchocerciasis (river blindness) and lymphatic filariasis (LF) across Ethiopia, Sudan and South Sudan.

References

External links

Charitable trusts
Health charities in the United States
Medical and health organizations based in New York (state)
1999 establishments in New York (state)